Bad Sport is a 2021 American six-part docuseries created for Netflix.

Summary 
The series features six different stories about sports and crime, which are told through first-hand interviews.

Release and reception 
It was released on October 6, 2021.

The series received a 100% approval rating based on 5 votes on the review aggregator site Rotten Tomatoes.

References

External links 
 
 
 Official trailer

2021 American television series debuts
2020s American crime television series
2020s American television miniseries
English-language Netflix original programming
Netflix original documentary television series
2020s American documentary television series
Documentary television series about sports
Documentary television series about crime in the United States